Lorentz Fisker (1753–1819) was a Danish naval officer who charted the waters of southern Norway and the Kattegat, and organised Norwegian defences against Britain and Sweden.

Early life
As the son of Vice Admiral Henrik Fisker, Lorentz Henrik Fisker accompanied his father on many voyages to the Levant, gaining so much experience that, at the age of only nine years, he was listed as a volunteer cadet and at 14 years old (in 1767) was already a junior lieutenant.  In 1761 Lorentz had been on board the Grønland, captained by his father, on a voyage to the Mediterranean whose main purpose was to deliver members of the Royal Danish Scientific Expedition to Arabia Felix (modern day Yemen) to Constantinople.
As the Grønland was passing Malta, young Lorentz fell ill and his father left him on the island in the care of some nuns.  On the ship’s return, Lorentz had recovered and came back on board.  Thirty-five years later, in 1796, when Lorentz Fisker was himself a captain, namely of the frigate Thetis, he had a tour of duty in the Mediterranean and visited Malta on many occasions.  One of the nuns who had nursed him back to health was by now the Abbess, and she had delivered to the Thetis each day a silver tray of magnificent cakes. 

1770–71
Fisker served on the ship-of-the-line Sophie Magdalene under the Admiral Frederik Christian Kaas off Algiers.

American War of Independence

1778
He went into the French naval service on the staff of Admiral Grasses, and later was second-in-command of a number of French frigates.
1779–1782
Fisker was present at the capture by the French of the British island of Grenada and the naval battles that followed.  In the ship-of-the-line Le Dauphin Royal under Guichon’s command he had three encounters with the British admiral Rodney, and later at the investment of Yorktown where General Cornwallis surrendered with 6000 men.  Amongst several other fights, where he took part in the capture of two British corvettes, he also survived the battle on 12 April 1782 near Dominique where Rodney defeated Grasse.  Awarded the French Order “pour le merite militaire”  Fisker’s contributions were acknowledged by the French foreign office.  He was recalled after peace was declared in 1783.

In Home Waters
1783–1796
Fisker had a busy period during which he was part ship's captain, part surveyor and map maker of the Danish and Norwegian coasts. In 1788 he was second in command of the royal yacht Hvide Ørn when the crown prince visited Norway. and later that year was appointed as adjutant to the Russian Admiral Von Dessen, who was in command of a joint Russian-Danish squadron.  In this position he came to take a major part in the inquiry into the Benzelsterna case 

In 1789 he was promoted to captain, and in the same year he married Charlotte Amalie Kofoed, daughter of the Director of the Post Office and of the Prison Service.
As captain of various ships, Fisker served in the Danish home fleet, including the ship-of-the-line Ditmarsk, and the frigate Fredericksværn in 1792 when this was a cadet training ship. In 1795 he travelled extensively in Jutland and the duchies of Schleswig and Holstein to determine the needs and positioning of coastal batteries.
1796–1797
The service in home waters was broken by a year in the Mediterranean in command of Thetis where he delivered the annual tribute to the Bey of Algiers.  Fisker had  diplomatic, but unsuccessful, talks with the old Bey of Tripoli, before being relieved by Steen Andersen Bille. 

On this voyage he carried the artist Bertel Thorvaldsen to Malta. Among some fifty miniature portraits  by Thorvaldsen are drawings of his fellow passengers made during this voyage
1800–1805
Back in Danish waters, Fisker was on the Trindel Light commission and, on land, enquiring into sites for placements of signal telegraphs.
In 1805 he was head of a squadron of various types of gunboats undergoing trials of their performance and suitability for coastal defence.

Active Service in Norway
After having worked as a recruitment officer in Norway, he joined (in 1806) the Construction Commission, but at the outbreak of hostilities with Britain the following year he was once again unemployed. In a very frank letter to the Prince Regent (later Frederick VI) he drew attention to Norway's unprotected state, as a result of which  he was appointed Adjutant General of the navy in Norway and soon after as chief of the entire Norwegian naval defence  - continuing the work already started by Jens Schou Fabricius and Hans Christian Sneedorff of reorganising Norway's preparedness. Within a year, with indefatigable hard work, he had a considerable number of gunboats and small armed vessels in service and in addition had improved harbour defences, and the coastal militia.

On 27 April 1808, in the war against Sweden, he advanced with  24 gunboats towards Strömstad on the Swedish border, but at Furuholm met with strong resistance and had, after ninety minutes battle, to retire.
Main article Battle of Furuholm

Conflict with Fellow Officers and the Admiralty
1809
Promoted to Flag Rank, from Norway Fisker submitted his 1809 proposals for the conquest of Heligoland and the recapture of the island of Anholt. The 1809 Anholt expedition came to nought, frustrated by late winter storms, and the 1810 attempt, led by Jørgen Conrad de Falsen, failed miserably.

Still, with the gunboats and brigs in Norwegian waters the Danish-Norwegian forces were able to capture, at various times in 1809, a total of two British brigs, 1 cutter, and 107 merchant ships. On 9 October 1809 Fisker was promoted to rear admiral.

In this year Fisker was decorated with the Commander Cross of the Order of the Dannebrog, 
1810
Lorentz Fisker had personally laid the plans for the Norwegian brigs’ attack on a large British convoy in the Skagerrak in July 1810. The plan met with total success, with 48 (merchant) ships being stopped and brought into various Norwegian harbours and before prize courts.  The auction thereafter of ships and cargoes raised some 5.2 million rigsdaler. Fisker was disappointed, however, that he was awarded only the flag officer’s portion, whilst the portion reserved for the Admiralty went to governors who had had nothing to do with the affair. As Fisker had already undertaken a division of the prize money to the men under him, Admiral Michael Bille rejected the protest. This gave rise to considerable friction between Fisker and Michael Bille, and later with other colleagues – a conflict that left Fisker embittered and that was only resolved in 1816.

Death

He retired from the service in 1810.  With prize money paid out in 1812, Fisker bought properties near Hellestrup and Ringsted on Zealand.  In 1812 he received the Grand Cross of the Order of the Dannebrog.

He died in 1819, and was buried in Holmens Cemetery in Copenhagen.

Notes

References

Citations
This article is largely translated from the Danish Wikipedia article :da:Lorentz Fisker which article acknowledges the Danish Biographical Dictionary edited by C.F.Bricka, Gyldendal (1887–1905) - see Project Runeberg as the primary source.
Project Runeberg: C With on Lorentz Fisker in Danish Biographical Dictionary 
Thiele: The Life of Thorvaldsen, Collected from the Danish of J. M. Thiele, by M. R. Barnard Paperback – 8 Aug. 2019 This is a reproduction of the original artefact from 1865 translated by M R Barnard. 
T. A. Topsøe-Jensen og Emil Marquard (1935) “Officerer i den dansk-norske Søetat 1660-1814 og den danske Søetat 1814-1932“. Two volumes. Download here.
Topsøe-Jensen, Th.:  Lorentz Fisker in Dansk Biografisk Leksikon at lex.dk accessed 9 June 2020

1753 births
1819 deaths
Recipients of the Pour le Mérite (military class)
Commanders of the Order of the Dannebrog
Grand Crosses of the Order of the Dannebrog
Royal Danish Navy admirals
Danish admirals
Danish military commanders of the Napoleonic Wars